Jerome Pathon (born December 16, 1975) is a South African-born Canadian American football coach and former wide receiver who played eight seasons in the National Football League (NFL). He later was a position coach for both the University of South Florida and University of San Diego football teams.

Early years
Pathon was a student of Carson Graham Secondary School in North Vancouver, Canada from 1987 to 1992 and attended Acadia University in Wolfville, Nova Scotia for one year (1993–94), where he had 44 receptions and 868 receiving yards and was named Atlantic University Sport (AUS) and Canadian Interuniversity Athletics Union (CIAU) Football Rookie of the Year.

University of Washington
Pathon was a standout wide receiver for the University of Washington Huskies, playing three seasons from 1995 to 1997. His 73 receptions his senior year still ranks fifth all-time on the Huskies' single season record book. He gained 1,299 yards receiving that year, an average of 108.3 yards per game, including 4 receptions for 54 yards in the Huskies' 51-23 victory over Michigan State in the 1997 Aloha Bowl.

NFL playing career

Pathon was originally drafted 32nd overall in the second round of the 1998 NFL Draft by the Indianapolis Colts. He was also selected by the Montreal Alouettes in the second round (11th overall) of the 1997 Canadian College Draft. Pathon played 46 regular-season games for Indianapolis (1998–2001) and 45 games for the New Orleans Saints from 2002-2004. On December 21, 2003 during his time with the Saints, he scored the touchdown in the famous play known as The River City Relay, which could have led to a tie game, but only for the extra point to be missed by John Carney. He also played for the Atlanta Falcons in 2005. He finished with 260 career receptions for 3,350 yards and 15 touchdowns in 99 NFL games played as well as 36 kickoff returns for 773 yards.

Coaching career
Pathon became the wide receivers coach at the University of San Diego in July 2009. Pathon became the wide receivers coach at South Florida in February 2012.

Lawsuit against the NFL
In December 2011, Pathon announced that he and a group of 11 other professional players had filed a lawsuit against the NFL. Pathon and his attorneys allege that the League failed to properly treat head injuries in spite of prevailing medical evidence, leading the players to develop effects of brain injury ranging from chronic headaches to depression.

See also
 Washington Huskies football statistical leaders

References

External links
 San Diego profile
 USF profile

1975 births
Living people
South African players of American football
Canadian players of American football
American football wide receivers
Canadian football wide receivers
Acadia Axemen football players
Atlanta Falcons players
Indianapolis Colts players
New Orleans Saints players
San Diego Toreros football coaches
Seattle Seahawks players
Washington Huskies football players
Acadia University alumni
Sportspeople from Cape Town
People from North Vancouver
Players of Canadian football from British Columbia
South African emigrants to Canada